Expeditie Robinson 2022 is the twenty-fourth season of the Dutch reality television series Expeditie Robinson. The season is filmed in Malaysia where 21 Dutch celebrities compete in tribes against each other for food, shelter and immunity and to avoid being voted off. Nicolette Kluijver returns to host alongside new co-host Rick Brandsteder. The season premiered on 29 August 2022 on RTL 4.

Contestants

Season Summary

Voting history

Notes

References

External links

Expeditie Robinson seasons
2022 Dutch television seasons